Church of the Dormition may refer to:

 Church of the Dormition of the Theotokos (disambiguation), a list of churches dedicated to the Dormition of the Mother of God
 Church of the Dormition of Saint Anne, any church dedicated to the Dormition of Saint Anne

See also
 Dormition (disambiguation)
 Cathedral of the Dormition of the Theotokos (disambiguation)